Emergency Room: Life + Death at VGH is a medical documentary series which premiered on British Columbia's Knowledge Network on January 21, 2014. It follows doctors, nurses and staff at Vancouver General Hospital (VGH) as they cope with real patients from the Greater Vancouver Regional District. VGH is the second largest hospital in Canada and British Columbia's only level I trauma centre.  Stories of stabbings, car accidents, heart attacks, and life-threatening disease are shown alongside everyday cuts and sprains, drunks, and other minor cases, and episodes contain graphic images of wounds, blood, and/or routine and invasive medical procedures.

The series was directed and co-executive produced by Kevin Eastwood, produced by David Moses, and executive produced by Andrew Williamson and Louise Clark of Lark Productions.

Episodes (Season 1)

Episodes (Season 2)

Episodes (Season 3)

Development and Production 

The series was conceived by Knowledge Network CEO Rudy Buttignol to depict the everyday experiences of the medical personnel who care for people in crisis.
Lark Productions, Vancouver General Hospital and Vancouver Coastal Health partnered to develop the series, and spent six months in negotiations to decide how to give the production crew maximum access while ensuring no patients suffered privacy violations, and that proper consent was obtained from everyone who appeared on camera.

Filming took place over an 80-day period between February and May 2013.

Initially, some staff opted out of participating, thus requiring the production team to blur their faces if they appeared incidentally in a scene that was used in the final edit, but in the end, more than 2000 people gave their consent to appear in the show. The camera crew also avoided filming certain patients undergoing mental health issues, due to the difficulty of obtaining informed consent, but were present for dozens of other traumas without complaint from hospital staff or patients.

Release 

Episode 1, "No Typical Day" premiered on January 21, 2014 and was the most watched program in its time-slot, as well as the biggest documentary series premiere in Knowledge Network's history.
Episode 3, "Full Moon", was given a special big screen presentation at the DOXA Documentary Film Festival in Vancouver on May 4, 2014 at which Eastwood, Murray Battle of Knowledge Network and members of the cast gave a Q&A.

Season 2 was shot over 80 days, and launched in April 2016.

Season 3 is the finale of the series - shot during December 2015 - and was screened theatrically in December 2016 at the Vancity Theatre. The two finale episodes were broadcast on Knowledge Network in February 2017.

Critical Reception 

Patrick Darbyshire of The Province called it "the most gripping dramatic series to watch online right now [over House of Cards on Netflix]" and said it was "as gripping and emotional as any TV medical show — and a lot more realistic than House."

Pamela Fayerman of the Vancouver Sun wrote "It has gripping life-and-death drama, a fast pace, and all the mayhem of a Hollywood action film...For unpredictable drama and insights into the mindsets of health professionals who choose this line of chaotic work, the series seems unbeatable." Marsha Lederman of the Globe and Mail wrote that the series "tiptoes through an ethical minefield in order to deliver what its creators strongly believe is important television; a peek behind the curtain at the hugely pressing issue of public health care.". And Vancouver Magazine said "no matter how cynical, expect too to fall in love with the driven, selfless adrenaline junkies who return shift after shift to this impossible job."
VGH emergency staff also spoke highly of the program. ER physician Dr. Shahin Shirzhad, featured in the show, told Global News: "We’re often dealing with resource issues, bed problems, not enough space or money to prepare care for everybody the way we’d like to...I think it’s been good at giving a very realistic picture of what we experience."

Awards 

Emergency Room won two Leo Awards: Best Documentary Series and the People's Choice Award for Favourite TV Series. The show also won a Golden Sheaf Award for Best Documentary Series at the Yorkton Film Festival and was nominated for two Canadian Screen Awards: Best Factual Series and Best Direction in a Documentary or Factual Series. In addition, the Vancouver Coastal Health Communications & Public Affairs department, which participated in the making of Emergency Room, won a Silver Leaf Award of Excellence and Bronze Quill Award of merit from the International Association of Business Communicators (IABC) for its Employee Engagement division submission.

Director's Cardiac Arrest 

During a break in filming, director Kevin Eastwood traveled to Los Angeles on business with a colleague, writer/actress Sonja Bennett. Outside a car rental office, Eastwood suffered a sudden cardiac arrest and collapsed. Bennett dialed 911 and administered CPR until an ambulance arrived. Paramedics used defibrillators to shock Eastwood's heart repeatedly until his pulse returned. He was then taken to Ronald Reagan UCLA Medical Center and put in an induced coma for three days. When he awoke, he had a cardioverter-defibrillator surgically implanted in his chest. He has since made full recovery.
Eastwood told The Georgia Straight that by the time he returned to filming at Vancouver General Hospital, word of his incident had spread among the staff. "They're the ones who keep underscoring how incredibly rare it is for somebody who has that kind of spontaneous cardiac arrest to, first of all, survive, and even those who survive, there are a small percentage who do not have brain damage. Less than 10 per cent survive in the first place, and a fraction of those are not permanently damaged." "This show changed my life," Eastwood says.

References

External links 

 
 Official Site: Emergency Room: Life + Death at VGH at Knowledge Network

2014 Canadian television series debuts
2010s Canadian television miniseries
2010s Canadian documentary television series
English-language television shows
2010s Canadian medical television series
Television shows filmed in Vancouver
Knowledge Network original programming